Le Mas-d'Azil is a commune in the Ariège department in southwestern France, containing a cave that is the typesite for the prehistoric Azilian culture. The Grotte du Mas d'Azil (sometimes hyphenated, sometimes not) is a "supersite" with rich remains of human usage from about 30,000 years ago, and is also a key site for the preceding Magdalenian culture. The D119 road runs right through the large cave, which is a natural tunnel 420 metres long and 50 metres high.

Population

See also
 Communes of the Ariège department

References

Communes of Ariège (department)
Archaeological sites in France
Azilian
Ariège communes articles needing translation from French Wikipedia